Kimberly Richey (born December 1, 1956) is an American singer and songwriter.

Career
Kim Richey came onto the music scene in the 1990s and entered her first recording contract at the age of 37. Kim signed with Mercury Nashville. She spent the next few years promoting her albums and touring with the likes of Wynonna Judd.

Compositions
Her songs have been recorded by Trisha Yearwood ("Believe Me Baby (I Lied)"), Radney Foster ("Nobody Wins"), and Brooks & Dunn ("Every River").

Recordings
Her May 1995 self-titled debut album was produced by Richard Bennett. It contained the singles "Just My Luck" and "Those Words We Said."

Her follow-up album, Bitter Sweet, was produced by Angelo and released in 1997. It contained the single "I Know".

Glimmer was released in 1999. Produced by Hugh Padgham (XTC), the album also features guitarist Dominic Miller (Sting).

Rise was released in 2002 and was produced by Bill Bottrell.

Her 2007 album Chinese Boxes was recorded in London and produced by Giles Martin.

Wreck Your Wheels was released in 2010. It was produced by Neilson Hubbard in his studio.

Released in 2013, Thorn In My Heart was again produced by Neilson Hubbard and features guest vocals from Trisha Yearwood. A limited edition version of the album was released in 2014 as Thorn in My Heart: The Work Tapes with only Richey on guitar and vocals.

Edgeland was released March 30, 2018, and produced by Brad Jones. Edgeland includes three different tracking bands of Nashville’s roots players. Like Thorn in My Heart, Edgeland was released on Yep Roc Records.

Discography

Albums

Singles

EPs
 2007: Little Record (Vanguard) - promo EP containing non-album acoustic versions of "Chinese Boxes," "Drift," "Straight As The Crow Flies," "Mexico," and "A Place Called Home"

Music videos

Contributed vocals to
 1987: Bill Lloyd - Feeling the Elephant (East Side Digital)
 1992: Radney Foster - Del Rio, TX 1959 (Arista)
 1994: Bill Lloyd - Set to Pop (East Side Digital)
 1994: George Ducas - George Ducas (Liberty)
 1995: Radney Foster - Labor of Love (Arista)
 1995: Reba McEntire - Starting Over (MCA)
 1995: Rodney Crowell - Jewel of the South (MCA)
 1995: Trisha Yearwood - Thinkin' About You (MCA)
 1996: Jolene - Hell's Half Acre (Ardent)
 1996: Keith Stegall - Passages (Mercury)
 1996: Mary Chapin Carpenter - A Place in the World (Columbia)
 1996: Tammy Rogers - Tammy Rogers (Dead Reckoning)
 1996: Trisha Yearwood - Everybody Knows (MCA Nashville)
 1996: Various Artists - Rig Rock Deluxe (A Musical Salute To The American Truck Driver) (Upstart Sounds)
1999: Jon Randall - Willin' (Eminent)
 2000: Ryan Adams - Heartbreaker (Bloodshot)
 2001: Brooks & Dunn - Steers & Stripes (Arista Nashville)
 2001: Will Kimbrough - This (Gravity)
 2002: Darden Smith - Sunflower (Dualtone)
 2007: Honeyroot - The Sun Will Come (Just Music)
 2012: Gretchen Peters - Hello Cruel World (Proper)
 2014: Jason Isbell - Southeastern (Southeastern)
 2015: Gretchen Peters - Blackbirds (Scarlet Letter)
 2015: Dean Owens - Into The Sea (Drumfire)

Songwriting collaborations

References

External links 
 
 
 

Musicians from Dayton, Ohio
Living people
American women country singers
American country singer-songwriters
1956 births
Lost Highway Records artists
Mercury Records artists
Lojinx artists
People from Zanesville, Ohio
People from Kettering, Ohio
Singer-songwriters from Ohio
Country musicians from Ohio
Yep Roc Records artists
21st-century American women